Yongdingmen, literally meaning “Gate of Perpetual Peace”, was the former front gate of the outer city of Beijing's old city wall. Originally built in 1553 during Ming Dynasty, it was torn down in the 1950s to make way for the new road system in Beijing. In 2005, the Yongdingmen was reconstructed at the site of the old city gate. This new gate is disconnected from the original road leading towards the gate and into the city (see photograph below).

During the Boxer Rebellion, on 11 June 1900, the secretary of the Japanese legation, was attacked and killed by the Muslim soldiers of General Dong Fuxiang near Yongdingmen, who were guarding the southern part of the Beijing walled city.

References

Gates of Beijing
Neighbourhoods of Beijing
Demolished buildings and structures in China
Ming dynasty architecture
Rebuilt buildings and structures in China
Dongcheng District, Beijing